The Birmingham Small Heath by-election was held on 23 March 1961 due to the death of the incumbent Labour MP William Wheeldon.  It was won by the Labour candidate Denis Howell.

Result

References

Small Heath
Birmingham Small Heath by-election
Birmingham Small Heath by-election
1960s in Birmingham, West Midlands
Birmingham Small Heath by-election